Jim Keeble is a novelist, travel-writer and screenwriter from Cambridge, England. He now lives in London with his wife.

For his travel-writing, Keeble won the 1995 "Travel Writer of the Year" award at the Travelex Awards, and his book Independence Day – A voyage around America with a broken heart was one of the New York Times' top six travel books of the year 2000.

As literary influences, Keeble states Anne Tyler, Michael Ondaatje, John Irving, Nick Hornby and Charles M. Schulz.

Bibliography 
 2000: Independence Day - A voyage around America with a broken heart
 2003: My Fat Brother (US title Men and other Mammals)
 2005: The A-Z of Us

Filmography 
 1994: A Sort of Homecoming
 1999: The Most Fertile Man in Ireland
 2008: Trial & Retribution (2 episodes)
 2008-: Silent Witness (6 episodes)

References 

 http://www.jimkeeble.com/index.htm
 http://www.penguin.co.uk/nf/Author/AuthorPage/0,,1000005227,00.html
 https://www.imdb.com/name/nm1636779/

21st-century English novelists
Comedy fiction writers
Living people
English male novelists
21st-century English male writers
Year of birth missing (living people)